The Mexican National Atómicos Championship (Spanish: Campeonato Nacional Atómicos) was a tag team championship for four-man teams, or Atómicos as they are referred to in Lucha libre. The title is a national championship, controlled by the Mexico City Boxing and Wrestling Commission, which regulates all matches where the title is defended. The championship was created in 1996 and was primarily defended in the Asistencia Asesoría y Administración (AAA) promotion. In early 2009, the reigning champions, Chessman and Los Psycho Circus (Killer Clown, Psycho Clown, and Zombie Clown) were stripped of the title and it was subsequently declared inactive.

Championship rules
The championship is a national title which means that non-Mexican citizens are prohibited from either challenging for or actually holding the championship. The title is also an Atómicos championship, meaning it is restricted to four-man tag teams. As is the case for every Mexican National titles, the championship is generally not allowed to be defended in any other type of match than a regular match. As it was classified as a national title, it officially prohibited non-Mexican citizens from challenging or holding the championship,, just like all other Mexican national championships. There have been instances where those rules have not been strictly enforced, but in the case of the atómicos championship, all champions were native Mexicans.

As it was a professional wrestling championship, the Mexican National Atómicos Championship was not won not by actual competition, but by a scripted ending to a match, determined by the bookers and matchmakers. On occasion, the promotion declares a championship vacant, which means there is no championship holder at that point in time. This can either be due to a storyline, or real-life issues such as a champion suffering an injury being unable to defend the championship, or leaving the company.

History
The Mexican National Atómicos Championship was created in 1996 specifically for the AAA promotion to control. The first champions were crowned after an eight-team tournament that saw Pierroth Jr., Villano III, Villano IV, and Villano V become the inaugural champions after defeating Damián 666, El Hijo del Espectro, Halloween, and Karis La Momia. In late 1996 Los Villanos left AAA for Promo Azteca, which meant the championship was inactive at that point. In 1997 Pierroth Jr. left AAA as well, with no reference made to the atómicos championship for about a  year. In August AAA held an eight-team tournament that saw Los Vipers (Histeria, Maniaco, Mosco de la Merced, and Psicosis) defeat Los Payasos ("The Clowns"; Coco Amarillo, Coco Azul, Coco Negro, and Coco Rojo).

Over the next four years Los Vipers and Los Vatos Locos ("The Crazy Guys"; Charly Manson, May Flowers, Nygma, and Picudo/Silver Cat) traded the championship between the two teams. By December 2, 2002, Oscar Sevilla and Los Barrio Boys ("The Neighborhood Boys"; Alan, Billy Boy, and Decnis) won the championship, ending the Los Vipers/Los Vatos Locos dominance of the title. The Black Family (Chessman, Cuervo, Escoria, and Ozz briefly held the championship for 21 days, before Sevilla and Los Barrio Boys regained the championship. The Black Family won the championship for a second time on August 20, 2004, beginning a 789-day reign.

In October 2006 Psicosis and his new team, the Mexican Powers (Crazy Boy, Juventud Guerrera, and Joe Líder) won the championship, only for a reorganized Black Family, now known as La Secta del Mesias ("The Sect of the Messiah"), to claim the title on May 20, 2007. The last atómicos champions, Chessman and the Psycho Circus (Killer Clown, Psycho Clown, and Zombie Clown) were stripped of the titles on January 25, 2009, by AAA Commissioner Vampiro, in a storyline where they attacked Vampiro after winning the championship. In December 2008, AAA announced that they would no longer recognize or promote any non-AAA branded shows such as the atómicos championship, the Mexican National Tag Team Championship, and the UWA World Light Heavyweight Championship. While AAA introduced the AAA World Tag Team Championship and the AAA World Trios Championship, later on, they never created an AAA World Atómicos Championship.

Reigns
The Mexican National Atómicos Championship was actively promoted by AAA from August 9, 1996, until January 24, 2009, a total of  days. In that period of time, 11 different teams held the championship, for a combined 17 reigns. Los Vipers members Histeria, Maniaco, El Mosco de la Merced, and Psicosis hold the record for the most reigns as a team, a total of four, while Psicosis also held it as part of Mexican Powers, putting his individual count at five. The Black Family's (Chessman, Cuervo, Escoria, and Ozz) second reign, from August 20, 2004, to October 18, 2006, was the longest individual reign at 789 days. The Black Family's two reigns combined to 820 days, the most combined days of any team. Cuervo, Escoria, and Ozz held the championship both as part of the Black Family and La Secta de Mesias, putting their individual reigns at 1,420 days. The shortest reign was also the final reign, as Chessman and Los Psycho Circus were stripped of the championship only 6 days after winning it before it was abandoned. The championship was only vacant once during its history, as the original champions, Los Villanos and Pierroth Jr. left AAA in late 1996. After this, the championship was inactive for more thab year until a tournament was held in August 1998.

Mexican National Atómicos Championship tournament (1996)
In mid-1996, AAA was given permission by the Mexico City boxing and professional wrestling commission to create the "Mexican National Atómicos Championship", sanctioned by the commission, but under the daily control of the AAA booking team.  Documentation for the full brackets of the tournament has not been found, but based on the results 10 teams competed in the tournament to determine the inaugural champions. After the initial rounds between August 3 and 4, 1996, two teams qualified for the third round: Pierroth Jr./Villano III/Villano IV/Villano V, and Damián 666/El Hijo del Espectro/Halloween/Karis La Momia.  On August 9 Pierroth's team defeated Máscara Sagrada, Máscara Sagrada Jr., Tinieblas Jr., and Blue Demon Jr., who had not previously won any tournament matches. Damián's team defeated La Parka, Super Caló, Winners, and El Mexicano, who had also not competed in previous rounds, en route to the finals. In the end, Pierroth Jr. and Los Villanos won the final match to claim the championship.

Mexican National Atómicos Championship tournament (1998)
When Los Villanos left AAA in late 1996, AAA declared the Mexican National  Atómicos Championship vacant and for approximately 1½ years did not have anyone else hold the championship. The company held an eight-team tournament in August 1998 to determine the second  Atómicos champions. The first round took place on August 3, with Los Vipers (Psicosis, Histeria, Mosco de la Merced, Maniaco), Los Insectos (Abeja Africana, La Avispa, La Hormiga, La Mosca), Los Vatos Locos (Picudo, Nygma, May Flowers, Charly Manson) and Los Payasos (Coco Amarillo, Coco Azul, Coco Negro, Coco Rojo) all advanced. In the next round, on August 13, both Los Insectios and Los Vatos Locos were eliminated. In the finals, Los Vipers defeated Los Payasos to claim the Mexican National Atómicos Championship.

Title history

List of Championship reigns by combined length

List of individual Championship reigns by combined length

Footnotes

References

External links
Official AAA website

Lucha Libre AAA Worldwide championships
Mexican national wrestling championships
Tag team wrestling championships
National professional wrestling championships